The 1927–28 Rugby Football League season was the 33rd season of rugby league football. Swinton won All four cups.

Season summary
Swinton won their second, and successive, Championship when they defeated Featherstone Rovers 11-0 in the play-off final.  Swinton had also ended the regular season as the league leaders.

The Challenge Cup Winners were Swinton who beat Warrington 5-3 in the final.

Pontypridd resigned from the League after playing 8 games, and their record was expunged from the table. They won 1 and lost 7, scoring 46 and conceding 149.
1927-28.

Swinton won the Lancashire League, and Leeds won the Yorkshire League. Swinton beat Wigan 5–2 to win the Lancashire Cup, and Dewsbury beat Hull F.C. 8–2 to win the Yorkshire County Cup.

Championship

Championship play-off

Challenge Cup

Swinton beat Warrington 5-3 in the final played at Wigan in front of a crowd of 33,909.

This was Swinton’s third Challenge Cup Final win from four Final appearances and completed a League and Cup double for the club.

References

Sources
1927-28 Rugby Football League season at wigan.rlfans.com
The Challenge Cup at The Rugby Football League website

1927 in English rugby league
1928 in English rugby league
Northern Rugby Football League seasons